Harry Ainlay High School is a high school located in Edmonton, Alberta, Canada, in the Royal Gardens neighbourhood, south of Whitemud Drive on 111 Street. The school is operated by the Edmonton Public School System and has a wide variety of educational opportunities for students, including full French Immersion instruction, the International Baccalaureate Program (designated an IB school since June 1, 1980, current IB coordinator: Dean Zuberbühler), Career and Technology Studies, and Registered Apprenticeship programs. The school has an enrollment of 2,889 students, making it the largest high school by student population in Alberta . Since opening in 1966, over 40K students have graduated from Harry Ainlay.

The school sports teams are the Titans. The school is named after former Edmonton mayor Harry Dean Ainlay.

Building 
The engineers at Harry Ainlay High School were T. H. Newton Engineering Ltd., and the architect was Donald Bittorf of the firm of Annett and Bittorf. The building was constructed in 1965. A notable element of the design of the school is the unusual lack of windows. This design feature has led to a local myth that the school was a repurposed bomb shelter.
"The school has several classrooms, science labs, a library, computer rooms, music room, industrial shops, two gymnasiums, an auditorium, a cafeteria, and several administrative areas."

Canadian Student Leadership Conference 
From September 25–28, 2018, the school hosted the Canadian Student Leadership Conference 2018. Speakers such as Chris Hadfield, Michel Chikwanine (a child soldier), Keith Hawkins, and Phil Boyte attended.

Academics

French Immersion 

Harry Ainlay is one of three high schools in the Edmonton Public School System that offers full French Immersion for all core courses.

International Baccalaureate Program

Harry Ainlay was the second school in Alberta to introduce the International Baccalaureate program and is one of eight schools in the Edmonton Public School System offering an International Baccalaureate diploma program. Having a diploma graduating class normally greater than fifty students, Ainlay has one of the largest IB classes in Alberta. However, this is often attributed to the large population base of the school, with about 450 students enrolled in the diploma program and 200 students enrolled in the certificate program each year.

Harry Ainlay currently offers IB courses in Biology (HL), English Literature (A1)(HL), History (HL),  Physics (SL, HL), Visual Arts (SL, HL), Chemistry (SL), French (B), Spanish (B), German (A1 or ab initio), Japanese (B or ab initio), Mathematics (SL), Mathematical Studies (SL), Music (SL), and Theatre Arts (SL). There have been several students who write A1 examinations in their native languages, including German, Arabic, and Japanese.

In the media 
On July 6, 2016, at approximately 2 AM, two people were hospitalized for a shooting that occurred near Harry Ainlay and Confederation Leisure Centre. The school was locked down on October 5, 2016, after an online threat on a student's Instagram page titled "clown.yeg". On September 13, 2017, a 15-year-old student was charged with bringing an airsoft pistol to school after an anonymous tip. The student was confronted at approximately 9:20 AM.

Notable alumni
Brent Belke – musician (SNFU, Wheat Chiefs)
Marc Belke – musician (SNFU, Wheat Chiefs)
Rick Campbell - Canadian Football League head coach
Lance Chomyc – Canadian Football League placekicker
Dwayne Goettel - musician (Skinny Puppy)
Chris Hardy – Canadian Football League safety
Samantha King – Canadian country/blues singer
Dion Phaneuf – National Hockey League defenceman
Steven Reinprecht – National Hockey League centerman
Kreesha Turner – pop singer

References

External links
Official site

International Baccalaureate schools in Alberta
French-language schools in Alberta
High schools in Edmonton
Educational institutions established in 1966
1966 establishments in Alberta